Ugetsu is a 1953 Japanese film by Kenji Mizoguchi.

Ugetsu may also refer to:
 Ugetsu Monogatari or Tales of Moonlight and Rain, a collection of stories by Ueda Akinari on which the film is based
 Ugetsu (album), a 1963 jazz recording by Art Blakey and the Jazz Messengers
 Ugetsu (Suikoden), a character in Suikoden IV

People with the given name
Ugetsu Hakua (born 1970), Japanese artist

Japanese masculine given names